Phrynobatrachus congicus is a poorly known species of frog in the family Phrynobatrachidae. It might be endemic to Democratic Republic of the Congo—it is only known from its unspecific type locality "Congo", which presumably corresponds to the modern-day Democratic Republic of the Congo. The specific name congicus attests to its origins: the Latin suffix -icus is meaning "to belong to". Common name Congo river frog has been coined for this species.

Taxonomy and systematics
Phrynobatrachus congicus was described in 1925 by Ernst Ahl as Hylarthroleptis congicus. The taxonomic status of this species is unclear. It has not been included in recent molecular studies, so its closest relatives are not known.

Habitat and conservation
Habitat requirements of this species are poorly known. It is probably similar to other species in the genus, and breedings takes place in water. Its population and conservation status are unknown.

References

congicus
Endemic fauna of the Democratic Republic of the Congo
Amphibians of the Democratic Republic of the Congo
Taxa named by Ernst Ahl
Amphibians described in 1925
Taxonomy articles created by Polbot